The 1981 Toledo Rockets football team was an American football team that represented the University of Toledo in the Mid-American Conference (MAC) during the 1981 NCAA Division I-A football season. In their fifth and final season under head coach Chuck Stobart, the Rockets compiled a 9–3 record (8–1 against MAC opponents), won the MAC championship, outscored all opponents by a combined total of 270 to 170, won the Mid-American Conference (MAC) championship, and defeated San Jose State, 27–25, in the 1981 California Bowl.

The team's statistical leaders included Jim Kelso with 975 passing yards, Arnold Smiley with 1,013 rushing yards, and Rodney Achter with 361 receiving yards.

Schedule

References

Toledo
Toledo Rockets football seasons
Mid-American Conference football champion seasons
Toledo Rockets football